Sir Rohinton Minoo "Ron" Kalifa  (born April 1961) is a British entrepreneur. He is the chairman of Network International, and formerly served as the chief executive officer of Worldpay Group from 2002 to 2013, continuing as vice chairman. Kalifa was appointed an Officer of the Order of the British Empire in the 2018 New Year Honours for his work in financial services and technology. He was later knighted in the 2022 Queen's Birthday Honours.

Career 
Before becoming CEO and then later Vice Chairman and Board Director of Worldpay, Kalifa held various roles within RBS where he built the Worldpay business organically and via acquisition. During his tenure as CEO he led Worldpay through its transition to a standalone company following its divestment from RBS in 2010 and oversaw the company's takeover by Vantiv in 2017.

As a public speaker and prominent figure in the payments sector, he spoke at various Money 2020 conferences. In addition, he was featured as a keynote speaker at the Innovate Finance Global Summit in 2016 and 2018 (IFGS 2018).

He is now Chairman of Network International, payments group in Africa and the Middle East. He joined just ahead of its IPO in 2019. He is currently also Chairman of FutureLearn, the educational technology platform. He is reported to be an investor in the Indian Premier League (IPL) cricket franchise, Rajasthan Royals.

Other activity
Kalifa sits on various not-for-profit boards. He is a Non-Executive Director for Transport for London, where he chairs the Finance Committee. 

In May 2019, Kalifa was appointed as a Non-Executive Director to the Bank of England’s Court of Directors. In March 2020, he joined the Council of Imperial College London. In July 2020, Kalifa was appointed by the UK government to lead an independent Fintech Strategic Review. 

The outcome of the review entitled "Kalifa Review of UK Fintech" was published on 26 February 2021, his report highlighted the opportunity to create highly skilled jobs across the UK, boost trade, and extend the UK's competitive edge over other leading fintech hubs. It sets out a series of proposals for how the UK can build on its existing strengths, create the right framework for continued innovation, and support UK firms to scale.

In January 2021, he became a member of the Government's Build Back Better Council, consisting of 30 members representing industries from retail and hospitality, to finance, science and technology. The purpose of the council is stated to be "to unlock investment, boost job creation, promote Global Britain and level up the whole of the UK." 

In November 2021, he was favored for a job as the Chairman of the Nominations Committee for ECB.

The Kalifa Review
During Budget 2020, The Chancellor of the Exchequer asked Ron Kalifa OBE to conduct an independent review to identify priority areas to support the UK’s fintech sector. The Review subsequently launched in July 2020.

The outcome of the Fintech Strategic Review entitled "Kalifa Review of UK Fintech" was published on 26 February 2021. His report highlighted the opportunity to create highly skilled jobs across the UK, boost trade, and extend the UK's competitive edge over other leading fintech hubs. It sets out a series of proposals for how the UK can build on its existing strengths, create the right framework for continued innovation, and support UK firms to scale.

The report’s recommendations included amendments to UK listing rules to make the UK a more attractive location for Initial Public Offerings, which were subsequently adopted in December 2021. It also recommended improvements to tech visas to attract global talent and boost the fintech workforce and the creation of a regulatory Fintech ‘scalebox’ to provide additional support to growth stage fintechs. The final recommendation was the creation of a Centre for Finance, Innovation, and Technology (CFIT), to strengthen national coordination across the fintech ecosystem to boost growth. The CFIT had a soft launch in early 2022. In November 2022, CFIT named Charlotte Crosswell OBE as its Chair. She will start the role on 4 January 2023.

Presenting the report to Parliament in April 2021, Rishi Sunak, then Chancellor of the Exchequer, concluded his speech by thanking Ron Kalifa and his team for their exceptional work in producing this “seminal review”.

Honours and awards
In 2017 he ranked 3rd on the Financial Times EMPower top 100 Ethnic Minority Leaders list.

He was appointed Officer of the Order of the British Empire (OBE) in the 2018 New Year Honours for services to financial services and technology. He was knighted in the 2022 Birthday Honours for services to financial services and technology and for public service.

References 

Living people
Officers of the Order of the British Empire
British businesspeople
Year of birth missing (living people)
Knights Bachelor
Parsi people
British people of Parsi descent
British Zoroastrians
1961 births